The volleyball tournaments at the 2013 Mediterranean Games in Mersin took place between 22 June and 29 June. Preliminaries of the tournament were held at Toroslar Sports Hall in Mersin while the finals were held at the Servet Tazegül Arena in Mersin.

Medal summary

Events

Participating nations
Following nations have applied to compete in volleyball tournaments. At least six nations competing is the requirement for tournaments to be held. None of the Asian nations opted to compete in any of the tournaments while none of the African nations entered the women's tournament.

Men

Women

References

 
Sports at the 2013 Mediterranean Games
2013